Al-Hirak ( also spelled al-Hrak or Herak) is a small city in southern Syria, administratively belonging to the Izra' District of the Daraa Governorate. It is situated about 40 kilometers northeast of Daraa, and is surrounded by the towns of Maliha al-Gharbiyah to the east and Izra' to the northeast.  According to the 2004 census by the Central Bureau of Statistics, al-Hirak had a population of 20,760. Its inhabitants are predominantly Muslims.
It was inhabited by families most of whom came from the Hijaz in the seventeenth and eighteenth centuries and settled there, such as Al-Zamil, Al-Salamat and Abu Salem, and all of whom belong to the Onaizah tribe spread in the Arabian Peninsula and Syria.
Among its most important features is the ancient mosque, once a Christian monastery and before that a pagan temple for the worship of Baal, the sun god.

History
In 1596 Al-Hirak appeared in the Ottoman tax registers under the name of ‘’Al Harak as Sarqi, being in the nahiya of Bani Malik al-Asraf in the Qada Hawran. It had an entirely  Muslim population consisting  of 61 households and 31 bachelors. They paid a fixed tax-rate of 40% on agricultural products, including  wheat, barley, summer crops, goats and bee-hives, in addition to occasional revenues; a total of 16,000 akçe.  Just to the west  was  al Harak al-Garbi;'' with a population of 17 households and 3 bachelors, also all Muslim. They also had a 40% tax-rate on agricultural products, and produced the same products. Their total tax  was 3,600 akçe, and part of the income went to a waqf.

In 1838 it was noted as being south of Al-Shaykh Maskin and having a Sunni Muslim population. Nearby Al Harak al-Garbi, later called Deir es Sult, was noted as deserted.

Syrian civil war

During the Syrian civil war, al-Hirak has served as a base for the opposition forces of the Free Syrian Army (FSA). On March 6, 2012 the town was severely damaged during clashes between the Syrian Army and the FSA, a fighting that was described by the United Kingdom-based Syrian Observatory for Human Rights as "very intense." Residential areas and the Abu Bakr al-Saddiq Mosque -serving as military base for the rebels- were reportedly hit by Syrian Army shells. During the battle, the FSA ambushed a Syrian Army armored carrier, killing five soldiers. A 15-year-old boy was reported to be killed after being allegedly shot by a government sniper. "Mosque al-Herak" is named on the Global Heritage Fund listing of damages to Syrian cultural heritage due to the military operations.

In July 2012 about 4,000 residents living in the south of Al-Hirak fled to neighboring cities in Syria or Jordan. On August 22, 2012, France 24 reported that the Syrian army had begun a campaign against Al-Hirak that led to a fierce battle. On August 24, 2012, the FSA withdrew from the town. On November 12 and 13, 2012, the town was reported as having a rebel presence and being shelled by the army.  On May 3, 2013, it was reported that the base of the 52 mechanized brigade of the 9th Division was shelling the area of Khirbet Ghazala and Al-Hirak On June 9, 2015, the FSA captured the second largest military base in the Daraa Governorate located east of the town.
On June 28, 2018, several locations were deserted by rebel forces in sequence: Battalion 49 Base, Alma, Al-Hirak, Battalion 279 Base, Al-Sourah.

References

Bibliography

External links
Map of town, Google Maps
El Karak-map; 21m

Populated places in Izra' District
Towns in Syria